Montalto Dora is a comune (municipality) in the Metropolitan City of Turin in the Italian region Piedmont, located about  northeast of Turin.

Main sights
Montalto Dora Castle, known from the mid-12th century but rebuilt in the 18th-20th centuries. It has a massive mastio and a chapel with 15th-century frescoes. The castle was owned by the bishopric of Ivrea, from which it went to the Duchy of Savoy in the 14th century. 
Parish church of Sant'Eusebio
Church of San Rocco (c. early 16th century), with Mannerist frescoes inside
Villa Casana, dating to the late 16th century but enlarged around 1918.

Twin towns
 Cannara, Italy

References

External links
 Castle of Montalto Dora official web-site
 www.comune.montalto-dora.to.it

Cities and towns in Piedmont